Luna is a municipality located in the province of Zaragoza, in Aragon, Spain. It is in the judicial district of Ejea de los Caballeros in the northeast of the province. It is 65 km from Zaragoza. According to the 2009 census (INE), the municipality has a population of 861 inhabitants.

History
The location of the city was conquered by Christians in 1092–1093.

Main sights
 Castillo de Villaverde
 Castillo de Obano
 Castillo de Yéquera
 Parochial church of San Gil de Mediavilla
 Santuario de Nuestra Señora de Monlora

References

Municipalities in the Province of Zaragoza